Diuris heberlei, commonly called Heberle's donkey orchid, is a species of orchid which is endemic to the south-west of Western Australia. It has three to five linear leaves at its base and up to four bright yellow flowers with a reddish brown border around the labellum callus. It is found along the south coast and is one of the last Diuris to flower in Western Australia.

Description
Flowering occurs between late December and February.

Taxonomy and naming
Diuris heberlei was first formally described in 1991 by David Jones from a specimen collected near Nannarup, east of Albany, and the description was published in Australian Orchid Review. The specific epithet (heberlei), honours Ron Heberle, orchidologist and discoverer of this species .

Distribution and habitat
Heberle's donkey orchid grows in winter-wet areas between sand dunes between Albany and Augusta in the  Jarrah Forest and Warren biogeographic regions.

Conservation
Diuris heberlei is classified as "Priority Two" by the Western Australian Government Department of Parks and Wildlife meaning that it is poorly known and from only one or a few locations.

References

heberlei
Endemic orchids of Australia
Orchids of Western Australia
Endemic flora of Western Australia
Plants described in 1991